Indonesian Aerospace N-245 is an Indonesian turboprop airliner being developed by Indonesian Aerospace. A refinement of the CASA/IPTN CN-235, the N-245 is designed for greater passenger capacity and lower operating costs than the CN-235. The N-245 has a longer body, and a newer engine type, a T-tail and no ramp door.

Design and development
When President Joko Widodo took office on 20 October 2014, he ordered the revival of several Indonesian aircraft in order to boost the Indonesian economy, including the N-250, which had been cancelled in 1998. After the successful revival of the N-219 aircraft, Indonesian Aerospace decided to make an improved and larger aircraft, and chose the N-245, a 50-seat turboprop airliner, as the N-219's successor. The airliner was named N-245 for "the spirit of '45", after the year Indonesia's independence of 1945. The program to produce the N-245 began in 2016. Indonesian Aerospace also stated its intention to produce the N-270, the 70-seat version of the N-245 and the N-219.

The design phase was slated to begin in 2017 and the first N-245 was to be done by 2020. The Indonesian government pledged to provide a total of $44 million to develop the aircraft.

On 10 February 2017, the N-245 and the R-80 were added to the project list. Due to this decision, the government was to prioritize the development of both aircraft, and accelerate the production timetable, saying that both aircraft could make a first flight as soon as 2019.

In July 2017, Indonesian Aerospace announced that it had entered into an agreement with Turkish Aerospace Industries (TAI) to collaborate in the development of N-245 and N-219. Under a Framework Agreement, the two organizations would work together on technical aspects as well marketing initiatives. The collaboration is expected to facilitate the conversion of the N-245 from an aircraft designed for lightweight transport into a cost-effective commuter airplane. Initial report cited TAI's involvement in the conceptual design activities of the N-245.

See also 

 CASA/IPTN CN-235
 IPTN N-250

References

External links 
 Menristek: Indonesia Produksi Pesawat N219 pada 2014

Proposed aircraft of Indonesia